The provincial flag of Mpumalanga was adopted in 1996, making the province the first (and so far, only) of South Africa's nine provinces to make use of an official provincial flag. The other provinces currently use the province's coat of arms on a white background. The design also features in the province's coat of arms.

Design
The canton of the flag is dominated by a stylised red Barberton daisy, a plant which is indigenous to the province. The diagonal strip of blue and white separating the green and gold bars is meant to represent the escarpment of the province's topology.

See also
List of South African flags

References

External links
 Flag of Mpumalanga at Flags of the World

Flags introduced in 1996
Mpumalanga
Mpumalanga